Owen Edmund Johnson (13 November 1919 – 6 August 2001) was an English professional footballer who played as an outside left.

Career
Born in Grimsby, Johnson spent his early career with Stoke City and Derby County. He signed for Bradford City in October 1946, leaving the club in July 1947 to sign for Shrewsbury Town. During his time with Bradford City he made 10 appearances in the Football League, scoring once.

Career statistics
Source:

Sources

References

1919 births
2001 deaths
English footballers
Stoke City F.C. players
Derby County F.C. players
Bradford City A.F.C. players
Shrewsbury Town F.C. players
English Football League players
Association football outside forwards